James Moodie (died 4 February 1724) of  Orkney was a Scottish politician.

He was the second son of Royal Navy Captain James Moodie of Melsetter, Orkney.  His mother was the daughter of James Douglas, 11th Earl of Morton.

He was elected unopposed
as the Member of Parliament (MP) for Orkney and Shetland in 1715, but was defeated at the 1722 election by his cousin George Douglas, later 13th Earl of Morton.

References 

Year of birth missing
1724 deaths
People from Orkney
Members of the Parliament of Great Britain for Scottish constituencies
British MPs 1715–1722